Crassiclava is a genus of sea snails, marine gastropod mollusks in the family Pseudomelatomidae.

Species
Species within the genus Crassiclava include:
 Crassiclava balteata Kilburn, 1988
 Crassiclava layardi (Sowerby III, 1897)
 Crassiclava omia (Barnard, 1958)
Species brought into synonymy
 Crassiclava apicata Reeve, 1845: synonym of Crassispira apicata (Reeve, 1845)
 Crassiclava halistrepta (Bartsch, 1915): synonym of Clionella halistrepta (Bartsch, 1915)

References

External links
 
 Bouchet, P.; Kantor, Y. I.; Sysoev, A.; Puillandre, N. (2011). A new operational classification of the Conoidea (Gastropoda). Journal of Molluscan Studies. 77(3): 273-308
 Worldwide Mollusc Species Data Base: Pseudomelatomidae

 
Pseudomelatomidae
Gastropod genera